Hewitsonia magdalenae is a butterfly in the family Lycaenidae. It is found in the Democratic Republic of the Congo (Uele and Equateur).

References

Butterflies described in 1951
Poritiinae
Endemic fauna of the Democratic Republic of the Congo